KNMC (90.1 FM) is a radio station licensed to serve Havre, Montana.  The station is owned by Montana State University-Northern and licensed to Northern Montana College. (MSU-Northern changed its name from Northern Montana College in 1994.)  It airs a College radio format.

The station was assigned the KNMC call letters by the Federal Communications Commission on March 20, 1985.

References

External links
KNMC official website

NMC
NMC
Hill County, Montana
Montana State University–Northern
Radio stations established in 1985
1985 establishments in Montana